Hnanisho (Syriac: ܚܢܢܝܫܘܥ; also Hnanishoʿ, Ḥnanishoʿ, Henanisho, Hanan-Yesu and other spellings) may refer to:

Hnanisho I, Patriarch of the Church of the East from 686–698
Hnanisho II, Patriarch of the Church of the East from 773–780

See also
Shemsdin, many of whose metropolitans had names incorporating Hnanisho
Enanisho, 7th-century monk with a similar name